Sofia Walbaum (born 18 May 1989) is a Chilean field hockey player.

Walbaum has represented Chile at both junior and senior levels. She made her junior debut at the 2005 Pan-Am Junior Championship, and her senior debut one year later in 2006. Her first major tournament was the 2006 South American Games.

Walbaum was instrumental in Chile's success at the 2017 Pan American Cup, scoring 2 goals in her team's campaign. The team ultimately lost to Argentina 4–1 in the final.

References

1989 births
Living people
Chilean female field hockey players
South American Games silver medalists for Chile
South American Games medalists in field hockey
Pan American Games medalists in field hockey
Pan American Games bronze medalists for Chile
Field hockey players at the 2011 Pan American Games
Competitors at the 2006 South American Games
Competitors at the 2014 South American Games
Field hockey players at the 2019 Pan American Games
Medalists at the 2011 Pan American Games
20th-century Chilean women
21st-century Chilean women